The 1986 World Chess Championship was played between Anatoly Karpov and Garry Kasparov in London and Leningrad (Saint Petersburg) from July 28 to October 8, 1986. Kasparov won. Anatoly Karpov was already assured of this rematch during his previous year's match, which was won by Garry Kasparov.

Results

The match was played as the best of 24 games. If it ended 12-12, Kasparov would retain his title.

Kasparov led by 3 points after 16 games but Karpov fought back with three straight wins to level the score with five games to go. After two tense draws, Kasparov won the 22nd game and drew the 23rd to clinch the retention of the World Championship. The 24th game was played to determine the distribution of the prize fund. It was drawn so Kasparov received the winner's share of the purse. Had Karpov won, the match would have ended in a tie and the purse would have been equally divided.

References

External links
1986 World Chess Championship at the Internet Archive record of Graeme Cree's Chess Pages

1986
1986 in chess
1986 in Soviet sport
1986 in English sport
1986 in London
International sports competitions in London
Sports competitions in Saint Petersburg
Garry Kasparov